Dezideriu Jacobi (23 March 1900 – 5 October 1924) was a Romanian football defender.

International career
Dezideriu Jacobi played in the first official match of Romania's national team at the 1922 King Alexander's Cup, against Yugoslavia. He was also part of Romania's 1924 Summer Olympics squad.

Scores and results table. Romania's goal tally first:

References

External links
 

1900 births
1924 deaths
Romanian footballers
Romania international footballers
Footballers at the 1924 Summer Olympics
Place of birth missing
Association football defenders